The turquoise flycatcher (Eumyias panayensis), also known as the island flycatcher, is a species of bird in the family Muscicapidae.  It is found in Indonesia and the Philippines.  Its natural habitat is subtropical or tropical moist montane forests.

References

turquoise flycatcher
Birds of the Philippines
Birds of Sulawesi
Birds of the Maluku Islands
turquoise flycatcher
Taxonomy articles created by Polbot